In the study of chronobiology, entrainment occurs when rhythmic physiological or behavioral events match their period to that of an environmental oscillation. It is ultimately the interaction between circadian rhythms and the environment. A central example is the entrainment of circadian rhythms to the daily light–dark cycle, which ultimately is determined by the Earth's rotation. Exposure to certain environmental stimuli will cue a phase shift, and abrupt change in the timing of the rhythm. Entrainment helps organisms maintain an adaptive phase relationship with the environment as well as prevent drifting of a free running rhythm. This stable phase relationship achieved is thought to be the main function of entrainment. 

There are two general modes of entrainment: phasic and continuous. The phasic mode is when there is limited interaction with the environment to "reset" the clock every day by the amount equal to the "error", which is the difference between the environmental cycle and the organism's circadian rhythm. The continuous mode is when the circadian rhythm is continuously adjusted by the environment, usually by constant light. Two properties, the free-running period of an organism, and the phase response curve, are the main pieces of information needed to investigate individual entrainment. There are also limits to entrainment. Although there may be individual differences in this limit, most organisms have a +/- 3 hours limit of entrainment. Due to this limit, it may take several days for re-entrainment. 

The term entrainment is applied because the biological rhythms are endogenous: the rhythm persists even in the absence of environmental cues because it is not a learned behavior but something that is inherent in organisms. Of the several possible cues, called zeitgebers (German for 'time-givers', 'synchronizers', 'external timekeepers'), which can contribute to entrainment, light has the largest impact.  Units of circadian time (CT) are used to describe entrainment to refer to the relationship between the rhythm and the light signal/pulse.

The activity/rest (sleep) cycle in animals is one of the circadian rhythms that normally are entrained by environmental cues. In mammals, such endogenous rhythms are generated by the suprachiasmatic nucleus (SCN) of the anterior hypothalamus. Entrainment is accomplished by altering the concentration of clock components through altered gene expression and protein stability.

Circadian oscillations occur even in the cells of isolated organs such as the liver/heart as peripheral oscillators, and it is believed that they sync up with the master pacemaker in the mammalian brain, the SCN. Such hierarchical relationships are not the only ones possible: two or more oscillators may couple in order to assume the same period without either being dominant over the other(s). This situation is analogous to pendulum clocks.

The phase of entrainment refers to the relative timing of any circadian event within the objective 24-hour day.

When good sleep hygiene is insufficient, a person's lack of synchronization to night and day can have health consequences. There is some variation within normal chronotypes' entrainment; it is normal for humans to awaken anywhere from about 5 a.m. to 9 a.m.  However, patients with DSPD, ASPD and non-24-hour sleep–wake disorder are improperly entrained to light/dark.

See also
Crepuscular – Animals active at twilight (i.e. dusk and dawn).
Diurnality – Animals active during the day and sleeping at night.
Nocturnality – Animal activity of sleeping during the day and active at night.

References

Further reading
 Pittendrigh CS (1981) Circadian systems: Entrainment. In Handbook Behavioral Neurobiology, Vol. 4. Biological Rhythms, J. Aschoff, ed. pp. 239–68, University of California Press, New York.

Circadian rhythm